Sutherland House, also known as the Sutherland-Hite House and Logan House, is a historic home located at Petersburg, Virginia. It was built between 1860 and 1862, and is a two-story, three bay, Italianate style brick dwelling. The house incorporates an 1838, one-story, former dwelling as a rear ell, and a frame addition built in 1877. The main house has a double-pile, central passage plan.  The house features two unusual chimneys made up of clustered flues on a low-hipped slate roof, tripartite windows, and a Doric order portico at the entry. Also on the property is a contributing two-story, four room brick service building.

It was listed on the National Register of Historic Places in 2011.

References

Houses on the National Register of Historic Places in Virginia
Italianate architecture in Virginia
Houses completed in 1862
Houses in Petersburg, Virginia
National Register of Historic Places in Petersburg, Virginia
1862 establishments in Virginia